Barry Joseph Cofield, Jr. (born March 19, 1984) is a former American football defensive tackle who played ten seasons in the National Football League (NFL). He was drafted in the fourth round by the New York Giants in the 2006 NFL Draft and has also played for the Washington Redskins. He played college football at Northwestern University.

High school career
Cofield attended Cleveland Heights High School where he was a letterman in football, basketball, baseball, and track.  In football, as a senior, he was named as an All-Midwest Region selection by SuperPrep, was a second-team All-State selection, was a first-team All-Lake Erie selection, and an All-District selection.  In basketball, he was an All-League selection and an All-District Honorable Mention selection.

Regarded as a three-star prospect, Cofield was listed as the No. 50 strongside defensive end in his class by Rivals.com. He chose Northwestern over Vanderbilt, and also had offers from Georgia Tech, Indiana, and Pittsburgh.

Barry Cofield is among the Cleveland Heights High alumni featured in the book Every Tiger Has a Tale.

College career
He played college football at Northwestern University playing  in 49 games with 36 starts and starting 36 of his last 37 games. A versatile player, Cofield started at right defensive tackle, left defensive end and left defensive tackle during his career. He finished with 197 tackles (88 solo), 6.5 sacks, and 15.5 stops for losses and registered 18 quarterback pressures with 8 pass deflections and a 16-yard interception return. He also recovered 3 fumbles and forced 4 others. He posted 5.5 of his 6.5 sacks and 11.5 of his 15.5 stops behind the line of scrimmage in his last 2 years. He played in every game as a true freshman in 2002 and registered 36 tackles (14 solo) with 2 stops for losses while causing and recovering a fumble in 12 contests. He earned a starting job at left defensive end as a sophomore and had 46 tackles (19 solo) in 13 contests. He added 1 sack, 2 stops for losses, 6 quarterback pressures, a forced fumble and a fumble recovery. He played right defensive tackle in 2004, when he started 11 games, collected 52 tackles with 3.5 sacks and 5 stops behind the line of scrimmage. Cofield added 5 pressures and batted away 3 passes. He earned Second-team All-Big Ten honors as a senior in 2005, when he lined up at left defensive tackle and recorded a career-high 63 tackles (24 solo) and had 2 sacks with 6.5 stops for losses and 7 pressures. He forced 2 fumbles, recovered another, deflected 5 passes and returned an interception 16 yards.

Professional career

2006 NFL draft
Projected as a mid-third-round draft selection, Cofield was described by Sports Illustrated as an "athletic prospect who flashes ability" and "offers potential at defensive tackle or as a two-gap lineman."

Cofield had a 465-pound bench press, a 660-pound squat.

New York Giants
Cofield was drafted by the New York Giants as the 124th pick in 2006 NFL Draft.  As a rookie in 2006, he started all 16 regular season games and the NFC Wild Card Game at nose tackle and led the defensive line with 67 tackles (43 solo). He also had 22 QB pressures, 3 QB hits and 1.5 sacks. In 2007, played in all 16 regular season games with 15 starts and started all 4 postseason games and finished with 41 tackles (21 solo), 1 sack, 6 QB hurries, 4 QB hits and 1 pass defensed. In 2008 Cofield started 15 games, made 43 tackles and 3 sacks and forced a fumble.  In 2010, his last season with the Giants, Cofield became famous for his 'taser' dance that he would perform after sacking the opposing quarterback.

Washington Redskins
On July 27, 2011, Cofield agreed to a six-year deal with the Washington Redskins that will pay him $12.5 million in guaranteed money.
Cofield, originally being a defensive tackle in the Giants' 4-3 defense, was converted to a nose tackle in Redskins' 3-4 defense. He received praise for how well his transition to his new position went due to the short amount time he had to learn how to play the position caused by the 2011 NFL lockout.
Cofield would end up starting in all 16 games of the 2011 season and recorded 25 combined tackles, three sacks, and a new career high of eight pass deflections.

On November 14, 2012, during the Redskins' bye week in the 2012 season, Cofield was made a co-defensive captain after a team vote.

Cofield was placed on injured reserve designated for return on September 9, 2014 after suffering a high ankle sprain. The Redskins placed him back on the active roster on November 11, 2014. He was released on February 27, 2015.

Second stint with Giants
On December 17, 2015, Cofield re-signed with the New York Giants.

Personal life
Cofield's sack celebration was ranked number one in recent NFL history by Bleacher Report.

References

External links
Washington Redskins Bio
Official Web Page

1984 births
Living people
African-American players of American football
American football defensive tackles
Northwestern Wildcats football players
New York Giants players
Washington Redskins players
Cleveland Heights High School alumni
21st-century African-American sportspeople
20th-century African-American people